Daniel Chamale (born March 16, 1993) is a Canadian soccer player who plays as a defender with the Milwaukee Wave.

Club career

Early career 
Chamale played at the college level with the Humber Hawks for the 2013–14 season. During his stint with Humber College, he helped the team secure the national college championship.

He also played in the Canadian Soccer League in 2013 with the Serbian White Eagles. In his debut season with the Serbs, he assisted the team in securing the final postseason berth in the First Division. Their opponents in the preliminary round of the playoffs were Kingston FC where the White Eagles were defeated from the competition. He returned for another season in 2014 where once more the team qualified for the playoffs by finishing sixth in the division. Kingston once again defeated the Toronto-based team in the tournament's opening round.

Indoor career 
In 2015, he played with Futsal Club Toronto where he won the national Futsal Canadian Championship.

Chamale transitioned into the professional indoor level for the 2016–17 season by signing with Milwaukee Wave in the Major Arena Soccer League. He aided the team in qualifying for the playoffs where they were defeated in the Eastern Conference final by Baltimore Blast. In total, he would appear in 20 matches and score 2 goals in his debut season. He would receive an All-Rookie honorable mention for his rookie season.

He would re-sign with Milwaukee for the following season. In his sophomore season with the Wave, the team clinched the Central Division title. However, their postseason journey concluded as the previous season in the Eastern Conference final losing once more to Baltimore. Chamale renewed his contract with the Wave for the 2018–19 season. He assisted Milwaukee in securing the double where they defeated Monterrey Flash for the championship. During their championship season, he appeared in 16 matches and recorded 7 goals.

In 2021, he would re-sign with Milwaukee for his fifth season.

International career 
Chamale made his debut for the Canada national futsal team on June 23, 2012, against Costa Rica in a friendly match. He was called to the national team for the 2016 CONCACAF Futsal Championship qualification against the United States. As the national team qualified for the tournament, he was selected for the team and recorded a goal against Curaçao in the group stages.

In 2017, he was selected for the Canada national beach soccer team to participate in the 2017 CONCACAF Beach Soccer Championship. Throughout the tournament, he recorded a goal against Mexico in the group stages.

He was selected to represent Canada once more in the 2021 CONCACAF Futsal Championship. The national team managed to advance to the quarterfinals but was defeated in a penalty shootout by Panama. In 2022, he was named the Canada Soccer Futsal Player of the Year.

References

External links
 Canada Soccer profile

Living people
1993 births
Soccer players from Toronto
Association football defenders
Canadian soccer players
Serbian White Eagles FC players
Milwaukee Wave players
Canadian Soccer League (1998–present) players
Major Arena Soccer League players
Canadian men's futsal players
Canadian beach soccer players
Canadian people of Guatemalan descent
Humber College alumni